Beidha is a town and commune in Laghouat Province, Algeria.

References

Communes of Laghouat Province